South Carolina Highway 93 (SC 93) is a  primary state highway in the U.S. state of South Carolina. It travels from U.S. Route 76 (US 76) and SC 28 in Clemson northeast to US 123 in Easley.

Route description
The highway begins at an interchange with the US 76/SC 28 concurrency and Old Greenville Highway east of downtown Clemson. West of this point, Old Greenville Highway passes through downtown Clemson and the campus of Clemson University and is signed as SC 93 though it is not officially part of the highway. SC 93 heads northeast exiting the city, it then has an interchange with US 123.  It then runs through Central to Norris, where it meets SC 137.  From Norris, the road continues northeast into Liberty.  In downtown Liberty, SC 93 intersects US 178.  After leaving Liberty, the highway continues toward Easley.  As it enters Easley on Liberty Drive, it promptly meets SC 8, after which it enters downtown on West Main Street.  Here, it intersects with SC 135 and becomes East Main Street.  After leaving downtown, SC 93 meets US 123 one last time, where its northern terminus lies.

History

SC 93 is the original alignment of US 123 from Clemson to Easley. When US 123 was given a bypass to the south of Easley in 1958, it was US 123 Business. Between 1962 and 1964, a new freeway was built to carry US 123 from Easley to Clemson. When this was finished, all of former US 123 from Easley to Clemson was renumbered as today's SC 93.

Major intersections

See also

References

External links

Former SC 93 ALT at Virginia Highways' South Carolina Highways Annex

093
Transportation in Pickens County, South Carolina